Benthophilus casachicus is a species of goby widespread along the eastern coasts of the Caspian Sea from the Cape Pischanyi to Ogurja Ada at south, also near Astrakhan.  This species prefers estuaries and coastal waters.  This species can reach a length of  TL.

References

Benthophilus
Fish of Central Asia
Fish of Russia
Fish of the Caspian Sea
Endemic fauna of the Caspian Sea
Fish described in 1978